Sanisette is a registered trademark for a self-contained, self-cleaning, unisex, public toilet pioneered by the French company JCDecaux. These toilets (and other similar toilets) are a common sight in several major cities of the world, but they are perhaps most closely associated with the city of Paris, where they are ubiquitous. In the United Kingdom they (along with automated public conveniences of other brands) are known informally as "Superloos".

Description
The Sanisette contains a toilet behind a door that opens when a button is pressed or, in the case of a pay toilet, a coin inserted into a control panel on the outside of the toilet. A washbasin is provided (the style varies with the model of Sanisette). When a user enters the toilet, the door closes to provide privacy. After the user has finished using the toilet, they exit and the door closes again. A wash cycle then begins inside the toilet, and the toilet fixture itself is scrubbed and disinfected automatically. After about sixty seconds, the toilet is again ready for use.

Special models exist for disabled users, although recent versions of Sanisettes are designed to accommodate both ambulatory users and users in wheelchairs. Some Sanisettes are designed to mount flush within a wall (sometimes seen in Paris Métro stations), or within decorative outdoor Morris columns. Most Sanisettes include indicators of their availability: ready, occupied, cycling (self-cleaning), or out of service. Sanisettes may be configured to require coins or to operate for free at the push of a button.

Sanisettes are usually configured to open the door after a preset period (typically 15 minutes) to discourage vagrants. The door cannot be opened from the outside unless the Sanisette is available and a coin is inserted (or the appropriate button is pushed). A handle on the inside of the Sanisette door allows it to be opened from the inside at any time (in recent versions, the door opens at the push of a button, but there is still a handle for emergencies).

Advantages and disadvantages

Sanisettes replace street urinals (particularly in Paris). Their unisex design allows them to be used by both men and women, for both urination and defecation. Their self-cleaning mechanism keeps them cleaner and helps reduce odours. Some models provide recorded music for the user. The locking door provides greater privacy than many older facilities.

Sanisettes carry a warning that young children must not be allowed to use the toilet alone as the weight sensor may not detect a small child, allowing the cleaning cycle to run with a child inside.

Ordinary Sanisettes are too small for wheelchair users, so special wheelchair-friendly Sanisettes have been designed.

In some areas of France, Sanisettes are misused for drug dealing, drug use, and sex work.

In Paris

The city of Paris rents Sanisettes from a subcontractor for about €1200 per month. There are some 420 Sanisettes in the city, and they are used about three million times a year. The city pays some €6 million per year to the JCDecaux company to operate and maintain the Sanisettes.

Originally all Sanisettes in Paris were pay toilets, priced at 40 cent per use (in 2002). In 2003, a dozen or so Sanisettes were converted to free operation, particularly near areas where homeless people congregate. In 2004, the same conversion was carried out on the 110 Sanisettes in the city's parks and gardens. Finally, the city of Paris decided to convert all its Sanisettes to free operation beginning in mid-February 2006 (the complete conversion was finished by 2014).

In 2009, the city of Paris upgraded all Sanisettes to a newer version with a number of new features and changes (pictured in this article).

Sanisettes have replaced vespasiennes (street urinals) also known as pissoirs, of which there were more than 1200 in Paris back in the 1930s. The only surviving vespasienne in Paris is on the Boulevard Arago, close to the intersection with Rue de la Santé. It is still regularly used.

See also 
 Electronic toilet
 Self-cleaning floor

References

 La Dernière Tasse 
 Sanisettes payants: évacuation 

Public toilets automation